The 2020 Missouri Republican presidential primary occurred on March 10, 2020. It uses the winner-take-most system, where a candidate must have an absolute majority to take all delegates.

Results

See also
 2020 Missouri Democratic presidential primary

References

United States Republican presidential primary
Missouri Republican
Missouri Republican primaries